Hassan Fadlallah (born 1967 in Aynata), is a Shia Lebanese member of parliament representing the Bint Jbeil district. He is part of Hezbollah March 8 alliance.

See also
 Lebanese Parliament
 Members of the 2009-2013 Lebanese Parliament
 Hezbollah

References

Living people
Members of the Parliament of Lebanon
Lebanese Shia Muslims
Hezbollah politicians
1967 births
Lebanese University alumni
Saint Joseph University alumni